Feyzullah Aktürk (born 1 January 1999) is a Turkish freestyle wrestler competing in the 92 kg division. He is a member of Balıkesir BB.

Career 
In 2022, he won the gold medal in the men's 92 kg event at the 2022 European Wrestling Championships held in Budapest, Hungary. Akturk claimed a 6–1 victory over Ahmed Sultanovich Bataev from Bulgaria in the 92 kg freestyle division in Hungary's capital. The honor marked Turkiye's landmark 100th gold medal in the history of the European wrestling championships. He won the gold medal in his event at the 2022 European U23 Wrestling Championship held in Plovdiv, Bulgaria.

He won the silver medal in the 97 kg event at the 2022 Mediterranean Games held in Oran, Algeria. He competed in the 92kg event at the 2022 World Wrestling Championships held in Belgrade, Serbia.

Achievements

References

External links 
 

Living people
Turkish male sport wrestlers
1999 births
European Wrestling Championships medalists
European champions for Turkey
European Wrestling Champions
Mediterranean Games silver medalists for Turkey
Mediterranean Games medalists in wrestling
Competitors at the 2022 Mediterranean Games
20th-century Turkish people
21st-century Turkish people